Lago di Alserio is an Italian lake located in the Province of Como, Brianza, Lombardy. On its shores lie the communes of Erba, Albavilla, Alserio and Monguzzo. The lake falls within the Parco regionale della Valle del Lambro, the regional park of the valley of the Lambro. Along its eastern shore is located a nature reserve known as the “Riva orientale del Lago di Alserio.”

References
The article originated as a translation of this version of its counterpart in the Italian Wikipedia.
LIMNO database of the water quality of Italian lakes

External links
 Riva orientale del Lago di Alserio

Alserio
Province of Como